Benjamin Harlow Beck (April 14, 1889 – January 26, 1968) was an American football and basketball coach.  He served as the head football coach at Nebraska Wesleyan University in 1919, at Hamline University from 1921 to 1923, and at Middlebury College from 1928 to 1941.  Beck was hired as coach of all freshmen athletics at Brown University in 1924.  

Beck was born April 14, 1889, in Bartley, Nebraska, to Charles and Sarah (Dillon) Beck. He attended Nebraska Wesleyan and graduated from the University of Nebraska with a Bachelor of Science degree. Beck died on January 26, 1968, at Guthrie Nursing Home in Woodstock, Vermont.

Head coaching record

Football

References

External links
 

1889 births
1968 deaths
Hamline Pipers football coaches
Hamline Pipers men's basketball coaches
Middlebury Panthers football coaches
Middlebury Panthers men's basketball coaches
Nebraska Wesleyan Prairie Wolves football coaches
Nebraska Wesleyan Prairie Wolves men's basketball coaches
Nebraska Wesleyan University alumni
University of Nebraska–Lincoln alumni
People from Red Willow County, Nebraska
Coaches of American football from Nebraska
Basketball coaches from Nebraska